Ribonuclease P protein subunit p38 is an enzyme that in humans is encoded by the RPP38 gene.

Interactions 

RPP38 has been shown to interact with POP4.

References

Further reading